Carex mucronata is a species of flowering plant in the genus Carex, native to the mountains of Austria, France, Germany, Italy, Switzerland, and the former Yugoslavia. Its chromosome number is 2n=36, with one report of 34.

References

mucronata
Flora of France
Flora of Central Europe
Flora of Southeastern Europe
Plants described in 1785